"More Than I Can Say" is a song written by Sonny Curtis and Jerry Allison, both former members of Buddy Holly's band the Crickets. They recorded it in 1959 soon after Holly's death and released it in 1960. Their original version hit No. 42 on British Record Retailer Chart in 1960. It has been notably performed by singers Bobby Vee and Leo Sayer.

The Crickets version
"More Than I Can Say" was the third single from the Crickets' second release, In Style with the Crickets. The song was written by guitarist Sonny Curtis and drummer Jerry Allison in around an hour in 1959. The hook was left unfinished at the time, and at the time of recording, the hook was left this way with no lyrics, only the "wo-wo yay-yay," which became a memorable part of the song. The single went on to become a minor hit in the UK, entering the top 40 and peaking at 26. Curtis considers this song to be one of his most enduring, looking back at the success subsequent artists have had performing it.

Personnel
 Sonny Curtis - vocals, guitar
 Joe B. Mauldin - bass
 Jerry Allison - drums
 Dudley Brooks - piano

Charts

Bobby Vee version
Bobby Vee was an American pop music singer whose prominence in the music industry arose from tragedy. After Holly, Ritchie Valens and The Big Bopper were killed in a plane crash on February 3, 1959, a then-teenaged Vee was one of a group of local musicians recruited to play at the next leg of a scheduled concert in Fargo, North Dakota. In 1961, Vee (whose other hit singles include "Take Good Care of My Baby" and "The Night Has a Thousand Eyes") recorded "More Than I Can Say", and it reached No. 61 on the Billboard Hot 100 chart. It was a bigger hit in the United Kingdom, where the song and its B-side, "Staying In", peaked at No. 4 on the UK Singles Chart. It also reached No. 8 in New Zealand.

Beatles live cover version
According to author Mark Lewisohn in The Complete Beatles Chronicle (p. 364), the Beatles performed "More Than I Can Say" live in 1961 and 1962 (in Hamburg and Liverpool and elsewhere). Author Allen J. Weiner in The Beatles: The Ultimate Recording Guide (p. 206) affirms this with the note that it came from a setlist made at the time by George Harrison. It is unclear whether the lead vocal was by John Lennon, Paul McCartney or Harrison. No recording is known to survive.

Leo Sayer version

Leo Sayer's version of "More Than I Can Say" spent five weeks at No. 2 on the Billboard Hot 100 chart in December 1980 and January 1981. Sayer's version of the song was certified gold by the RIAA. It also spent three weeks at No. 1 on the Billboard Adult Contemporary chart. In the UK, the song peaked at No. 2 on the UK Singles Chart, while it spent two weeks atop the Kent Music Report in Australia. Sayer has stated that while looking for an "oldie" to record for his album Living in a Fantasy, he saw a TV commercial for a greatest hits collection by Vee and chose the song on the spot: "We went into a record store that afternoon, bought the record and had the song recorded that night."

The Sayer version was covered in French (as "Personne ne le sait") by Canadian singer Renée Martel on her album Un coin du ciel (1981).

The music video for the song was frequently aired on MTV when that channel launched on August 1, 1981.

Chart performance

Weekly charts

Year-end charts

Other versions
Irish singer Darren Holden covered "More Than I Can Say" in 1997, reaching No. 20 in Ireland.

See also
 List of number-one singles in Australia during the 1980s
 List of number-one adult contemporary singles of 1980 (U.S.)

References

External links
 Leo Sayer single release info at discogs.com

1960 songs
1961 singles
1980 singles
1997 singles
Bobby Vee songs
Leo Sayer songs
Number-one singles in Australia
Songs written by Sonny Curtis
Songs written by Jerry Allison
Song recordings produced by Alan Tarney
Coral Records singles
Warner Records singles